Charles Berkeley (born August 21, 1976) is an American bobsledder who has competed since 2007. His lone World Cup victory was in the two-man event at Lake Placid, New York on 21 November 2009.

Berkeley qualified for the 2010 Winter Olympics, crashing out in the four-man event.

References
 

1976 births
American male bobsledders
Bobsledders at the 2010 Winter Olympics
Living people
Olympic bobsledders of the United States
Place of birth missing (living people)
21st-century American people